Joshua Collins Stamberg (born January 4, 1970) is an American actor. He was regular cast member in the Lifetime comedy-drama series Drop Dead Diva from 2009 to 2012, and later had recurring roles on Parenthood, The Affair, and WandaVision.

Life and career 
Stamberg was born in Washington, D.C., the son of journalist Susan Stamberg and Louis C. Stamberg. He attended the University of Wisconsin–Madison.

Stamberg appeared in numerous television shows, including Nashville, Law & Order, CSI: Miami, Grey's Anatomy and Parenthood. He also appeared in the Lie to Me pilot. Stamberg appears as S.W.O.R.D. Director Tyler Hayward in the WandaVision Marvel series on Disney+. His film appearances include Fracture, Must Love Dogs and Kate & Leopold.

In 2020, Stamberg appeared as a guest on the Studio 60 on the Sunset Strip, and in the marathon fundraiser episode of The George Lucas Talk Show.

He is married to actress Myndy Crist. They have two daughters, one of whom is named Vivian.

Filmography

Film

Television

References

External links
 

1970 births
20th-century American male actors
21st-century American male actors
American male film actors
American male television actors
Jewish American male actors
Living people
Male actors from Washington, D.C.
University of Wisconsin–Madison alumni
21st-century American Jews